Shone may refer to:
 "Shone" (song), a 2009 song by Flo Rida
 Shone, Ethiopia, a town in Badawacho District
 Shone (surname)

People with the given name
 Shone An (1983–2015), Taiwanese singer, actor and television host

See also 
 Shine (disambiguation)
 Shone's syndrome